Alexander Dubchenko (born 19 February 1995) is a Russian male track cyclist, representing Russia at international competitions. He competed at the 2016 UEC European Track Championships in the 1 km time trial event.

References

1995 births
Living people
Russian male cyclists
Russian track cyclists
Place of birth missing (living people)
European Games competitors for Russia
Cyclists at the 2019 European Games